Chebaki (Khakass: Чабах аалы, Çabax aalı) is a village in the Shirinsky District of Khakassia, Russian Federation.

Geography 
It is located on the banks of the Cherny Iyus river 80 km northwest of the regional center  the village of Shira and the railway station.

Nearby mountain Krestovka 912m,  on the south nearest ridge Znamenitovskiye Gol'tsy 1446m , stream bed Tserkovnyy and freshwater lake Chernoye, lake Reyngol.

The left bank of the Yenisei part of the Minusinsk basin, belong to zoographic site of Yenisei Siberia.

Surrounding relief is varied along with areas almost flat, both isolated hills and ridges of hills or spurs of the surrounding mountains with steep slopes, narrow valleys and intermountain depressions. The lowlands lie at an altitude of 300 m above sea level, the heights reach 900 m. The climate is sharply continental.

The following species, characteristic of the southern steppe regions, find here the northern limit of their habitat: Ardea cinerea, Nyroca Ferina, Tadorna Tadorna, Recurvirostra avoceta, Totanus totanus, Sterna hirundo minussensis, Upupa epops, Pyrrhocorax Pyrrhocorax, Otocoris brandti, Otocoris brandti Montana, Calandrella brachydactyla, Locustrella naevia mongolica.

From among the species of adjacent Mongolia, Cygopsis cygnoides penetrate here. Otis Dybowskii, Emberiza godlewskii, perdix daureca.

Acrocephlus ogricola comes here from the west from neighboring Altai Phylloscopus tristis fulvescens.

Toponym and etymology 
The village name comes from the name of the khakas Chebak Serenev of Chebakinsky ulus  / Chebakevsky ulus / Chebak aal, founded in 1790.   

.   

Chebak, or Siberian roach (lat. Rutilus rutilus lacustris) is a subspecies of roach, a ray-finned fish from the carp family, common in Siberia and the Urals.

A chebak is fur hat  with earmuffs, ties and nape.  It been known since the 18th century in the Yenisei and Tobolsk provinces  as winter headdress worn by married women. It was a spherical hat with headphones and a long back blade, called the tail.   (Teleut) čаbаk is a tall women hat.

Chebak kind of scraper, in mining.

In 1893  name of the settlement the village of Pokrovskoe (Chebaki) ,Yenisei province, Achinsk district, Kizyl administration. It was named Pokrovskoe after Po­krova Bogoroditsy church  which was built at the expense of the gold miner Z. M. Tsybulsky (1867, nowadays not preserved)

In reports for 1893   orthodox priest Matvey Tyzhnov from Pokrovskoe (Chebaki) of the Achinsk district of the Yenisei province mentioned of sacred  object, the embodiment of the spirit of fire,   and the rituals of their veneration in connection of shaman tradition and spiritual life of the Khakass.

History 
The territory belonged to the Siberia Governorate (until 1779), the Kolyvan Oblast (1779 - 1783), the Kolyvan Governorate (1783 - 1796), the Tobolsk Governorate (1796 - 1804), the Tomsk Governorate (1804 - 1822), Achinsk-Minusinsk Mining Okrug    (Minusinsk Okrug 1822-1898, Minusinsk Uezd 1898-1925) of Yeniseysk Governorate (1822 - 1925).

Founded in the 19th century Chebaki was part of Yeniseysk Governorate (1822 -1925), as establishment of gold miners. It was the residence of the gold miners Z. M. Tsibulsky and his cousin-nephew and heir K. I. Ivanitsky.     

In 1867 Po­krova Bogoroditsy church become part of orthodox parishes of the Yenisei Governorate, Achinsk uezd, Uzhur volost.      

The parish was formed on the territory of the Kizyl Inorodtsy volost of the Achinsk uezd. It included 38 uluses.

In 1888, on January 24, a school was opened at the  Po­krova Bogoroditsy church.  

In order to strengthen the educational resources of the population of the Yenisei diocese in general and missionary parishes in particular, the Brotherhood at the Krasnoyarsk Cathedral in the Name of the Nativity of the Blessed Virgin Mary from 1894   began to supply the libraries of church parochial schools with books for out-of-class reading. In missionary reports of that time local population were described as "inorodtsy"  and their customs or superstitions and their rituals and believes were different. 

For literate population readings with light paintings in the parish church schools of the diocese were arranged (2 sciopticons and 60 paintings in each district of the diocese). In 1897 total 10 sciopticons (magic lanterns) and 600 paintings on glass were ordered from the Moscow manufacturer Swiss citizen Theodor Schwabe, a physico-optical mechanic. For  the timely exchange of pictures between schools of neighboring districts, a timetable for the movement of the sciopticons (magic lanterns) and a light pictures were published in the yearly gazette Eparkhalnye Vedomosty.

In the Minusinsk district   in the Chebakovsky-Pokrovsky parish with a non-Russian population , on August 1, 1897, a seminary student Pavel Sukhovsky was ordained.  Only 17 boys and 1 girl, of which 10 were non-Russian population studied at the Pokrovsky parish school, while more kinds were attending school, for total adult parish population 2288 people in 1897 it were quite small amount.

In 1912   a one-class ministerial school opened and in 1916 school already enrolled 80 boys and 40 girls, the school were in excellent condition and respected by the population.

In 1916  in the description of the Chebakovsky-Pokrovsky parish:

From 1924 - 1933 the village of Chebaki is the administrative center of the  Chebakovsky District, included 24 village and town councils.

In the spring of 1924, a reading room was opened in the village of Chebaki in the club's premises. Club included political club, drama club, music club, club for the study of the charter of the VSKSM. A paramedical station in Chebaki  had two employees, a paramedic and a midwife, provided only outpatient care. There were no medicines in the first-aid post, there were only one damaged thermometer and two old tweezers.

In 1926        Chebaki near the Ivanovka River (probably a tributary stream of Black Iyus River) already there is a school, a district executive committee, a credit partnership, a shop, a hospital, a library.

In 1933, the center of the Chebaki District of the West Siberian Krai was moved to the village of Shira, Russia.

Population 
The earliest information about the village was found in the document of 1864, in Lists of settlements of the Achinsk district, plot 2 N295 settlement - ulus (state) Chebakinsky (Chebak aly). Distance from the district town of Achinsk  240 versts. Number of households 31. The number of inhabitants 114 male,  98 female.

Many Chebaki  residents  fought and died during the Fist World War 1914-1918, Russian Civil War 1918-1921,  Repressions,  Second World War 1941-1945.

In the village of Chebaki  there is the largest mass grave, more than 170 people, deceased on the Eastern Front of the Russian Civil War by  Kolchac Army or policemen in the taiga or on the roads and buried where they died, later reburied in a mass grave in the rural square of the village of Chebaki in 1921. There are 75 miners of the  Kommunar goldmine (former Bogomdarovanny goldmine) in a mass grave. On the first obelisks was the text "To the fighters who fell for the cause of the revolution of 1917-1920", later text on obelisk "Memorial to Civil War Heroes".

In 2004 the number of households is 34, the population is 78 people, including Russians, Khakasses  (30%) etc.

Notable natives and people 

 Tsibulsky Zakhary Matveyevich merchant of the first guild, gold miner,  philanthropist. Donated 200 thousand rubles for the completion of the cathedral in Tomsk, 200 thousand rubles for the Imperial Tomsk University  first University in Siberia under construction in Tomsk at that time. The founder of the sanatorium business in the Yenisei province in 1873.  He came up with the idea to organize a resort at nearby Lake Shira, after he experienced the healing properties of the salt lake and then made an attempt to study them.  Tsibulsky build his summer residence at Chebaki, later the house became the property of Ivanitsky.:

 Ivanitsky K. I. the gold miner. After the death of Tsybulsky, his affairs and property passed to I.M. Ivanitsky, and after the death of the latter - to his son Konstantin Ivanovich, who thus became the owner of a large hereditary property. The Russian revolution forced K.I. Ivanitsky to flee to Manchuria, to Harbin: 

 Zertsalov, Gennady Ivanovich (1940-2021)  Soviet party leader, first secretary of the Kazan City Committee of the CPSU, chairman of the Kazan City Council of People's Deputies (1990-1991).

Economy 
In 1917 in data description it was mentioned about presence of consumer society in village, also of livestock in the village: horses  737, working horses  571, foals up to a year  76; cattle  999, dairy cows  448, calves up to a year 258; sheep and goats 1080, pigs and piglets  104. Number of farms without arable land  107. Under crops 281.5 acres. Winter rye 11 dessiatin; Jaritsy (spring wheat or spring rye) 64 dessiatin. Oats 78.4 dessiatin. All other cultures  70.2 dessiatin. Convertible husbandry area  63.1 dessiatin. The area of meadow or hay lots is 1430 dessiatin.

USSR period        

Russia period       now only the Berendey farm and the Praskovya phytocentre are operating.

Attractions 

 The house of  Ivanitsky is a two-story mansion  with a tower-balcony and a spire was built in the second half of the 19th century from good age-old larches.  Mansion is  decorated with carved platbands, openwork belts - cornices between floors. The house has been preserved,  it was a school, then orphanage and recently,  after a small internal reconstruction, the children's tourist recreation camp "Tourist" was located in the mansion. Nowdays the house of Ivanitsky is recognized as a valuable architectural monument of Khakassia of Federal significance.
 In 1978 Gorky Film Studio produced historical film (Estern) "The end of the taiga Emperor" (Director Vladimir Sarukhanov, Screenplay  Boris Kamov and Pavel Lungin) about the 1920s RSFSR and Russian Civil War  on territory of Siberia, in Pokrovskoe (Chebaki) and Khakassia. The film reproduces one of the little-known pages  of the biography of Arkady Golikov  (future writer Arkady Gaidar and grandfather of Yegor Gaidar) and cossacks under Ataman Solovyov.
 Nearby attraction an ancient fortress Chebaki fortress Sve-Takh.

References

General references 
 Decree of the Presidium of the Central Executive Committee of the USSR of 06/07/1933. "On the renaming of the districts of the same name and regional centers of the West Siberian Territory"
 Monuments of history and culture of the Russian Federation. Archived on September 7, 2014., ITAR-TASS-SIBERIA (inaccessible link - history).
 Encyclopedia of the Republic of Khakassia: [in 2 volumes] / Government of the Rep. Khakassia; [scientific-ed. advice: V. A. Kuzmin (prev.) and others]. - Krasnoyarsk: Polikor, 2008. Vol. 2: [O - I]. 320 p. : illus. S. 268 ISBN 978-5-91502-008-4

Rural localities in Khakassia
History of Siberia
Films shot in Siberia
Wooden houses